Alien vs Predator is a 1994 first-person shooter developed by Rebellion Developments and published by Atari Corporation for the Atari Jaguar on October 21 and later in Japan by Mumin Corporation on December 8 of the same year, where it became a pack-in game when the console was launched in the region. It is the first game in the Alien vs. Predator franchise to be developed by Rebellion.

Set in the Golgotha Training Base camp, the player takes control of either the Alien, Predator or the human Private Lance J. Lewis of the Colonial Marines, each having their own storyline. Alien vs Predator was originally under development by Images Software for the Atari Lynx, where it featured references to the comic book series Aliens vs. Predator by Dark Horse Comics and was a corridor-based shooter but after its cancellation, it was then planned to be a port of the SNES beat 'em up title of the same name for the Jaguar, which was previously developed by Jorudan in 1993 but was changed into a first-person shooter when Atari Corporation resubmitted the project to both 20th Century Fox and Activision.

Alien vs Predator received critical acclaim when it was released, with critics praising its atmosphere, graphics and single-player campaign, garnered multiple awards and was referred by various publications as one of the best games for the Jaguar. It was also a commercial success, selling between 52,223-85,000 copies, becoming one of the best-selling games for the system as of July 1995 and regarded as its killer app, though it is unknown how many were sold in total during its lifetime. Atari Corporation had opened discussions with Beyond Games about their interest in developing a sequel to the game, titled Alien vs Predator 2: Annihilation, but dropped out of these negotiations shortly before they officially discontinued the Jaguar.

Gameplay 

Alien vs Predator is a first-person shooter presented with digitized graphics on a rudimentary 3D environment, similar to Wolfenstein 3D, with two-dimensional digitized sprites. Each of the three playable characters have their own scenario, objectives, weapons, abilities and disadvantages. All of the enemies in the three campaigns do not emit any other sound effects, except when they are attacking the player. Progress, high scores and other settings made by the player are manually kept by pausing the game and saving in any of the three available save slots via the cartridge's internal EEPROM.

When playing as the Alien, the player's objective is to rescue the Alien queen, who is being held captive on a Predator spaceship. The player must fight numerous marines and Predators through various sublevels of the ship in order to reach the Queen. The Alien is unable to heal itself from injuries and instead "cocoons" marines; if the Alien dies, a previously cocooned marine will spawn a new Alien, allowing the player to continue from that location. The Alien is unable to use elevators and instead travels between levels of the ship through air ducts.

As the Predator, the player's objective is to reach and kill the Alien queen in order to claim her skull. The Predator can use elevators to travel between levels but he cannot travel through the air ducts. He can carry medical kits and use them later to recover health, and can use a cloaking device to become invisible from the Marines, but not the aliens. Weapons and scoring are based on how the Predator kills enemies. Killing an enemy while invisible results in a loss of honor points, which can in turn result in losing equipped weapons. Killing an enemy while visible result in an increase of honor points, which in turn allows access to more weapons. Available weapons in this scenario include a wrist blade, combi stick, smart disc and shoulder cannon. Stepping on the Alien's acidic blood after being killed results in a loss of health. The Predator can get attacked by the Facehugger.

As Private Lance J. Lewis of the Colonial Marines, the player's objective is to escape from the military base that has been invaded by Aliens and Predators. At the start of the game, Lewis awakes in the base's brig after a cryosentence for strike offence at an officer and has no weapons, motion tracker, or security clearance. The player must find new weapons and security cards in order to fend off enemies and access new sublevels of the base, activate the base's self-destruct mechanism, and escape from the area in the escape pod. Lewis can use medical kits and food scattered in the base to recover health, but unlike the Predator, he cannot carry them and must use them immediately. Similarly, he cannot carry ammunition found on the base so the player must conserve ammo as much as possible in order to defend themselves. He can also use computer terminals in the medical laboratories to recover health, but the final amount of health possible depends on the grade of the security card which the player possesses. Lewis can also access computer terminals scattered around the sublevels to learn more about the backstory of the base after the occupation by the Aliens and computer terminals in the armory to learn more about the weapons available found on the corpses of the marines. Available weapons in this scenario include a shotgun, pulse rifle, flamethrower, and smart gun. As Lewis, the player can use both air ducts and elevators to access new sublevels. Like the Predator, Lewis can get attacked by the Facehugger and lose health by stepping on acidic blood.

Plot 
Taken from the introduction in the manual of the game:

Alien vs Predator is a tactical simulator depicting the events following the fall of the Camp Golgotha Colonial Marine Training Base to a group of xenomorphs [aliens] not yet fully classified. Limited data from the incident allow for reasonably extrapolated simulations from the viewpoint of the two alien groups believed to have participated in the incident. The data contained herein is considered top secret as of this release, and any duplication, distribution or display is punishable by court-martial with a maximum penalty not to exceed seven years imprisonment in the Yuggoth penal colony, SYS Aldeberan IV. [USCMC, 53622a]

The game takes place in the Golgotha Training Base of the United States Colonial Marines Corps built by Weyland-Yutani on the Vortigern Sector Perimeter. When an unknown Space Jockey Boneship vessel approaches the base, a Chatterjee Class tug is sent to retrieve it for further examination. As soon as the vessel is aboard on the base, it is quickly overrun by the Aliens, leading to the evacuation of civilians, recruits and personnel of the base from the area via escape pods, while the remaining Colonial Marines go into defensive positions in an attempt to protect the base from the xenomorphs and sending an emergency distress signal requesting for backup. After the occupation of the training base by the Aliens, a Predator ship looms over the horizon from their home planet preparing itself for boarding the station after receiving the signal and seeing this as an opportunity to hunt down the xenomorphs.

Production

Background 
Rebellion Developments was founded in 1992 by brothers Jason and Chris Kingsley. The pair just finished their academic degrees at the University of Oxford, and had ambitions of starting doctorates. While in their spare time, they did freelance work in the games industry. When their freelance job roles began to expand and taking on more management responsibilities, they decided to establish the company in Oxford. The foundation of the studio was laid when the brothers secured a deal with Atari UK. Rebellion presented a 3D dragon flight game demo for the Atari Falcon, which depicted dragons against Viking longships to directors at the publisher, including then-Atari UK CEO Bob Gleadow and Software Development Manager Alistair Bodin, who were seeking games for the then-upcoming Atari Jaguar. They were commissioned by the company to work on two titles for the Jaguar: Alien vs Predator and Checkered Flag.

Development 

According to producer James Hampton, Alien vs Predator originally started as a corridor-based shooter for the Atari Lynx that was in development by Images Software, a UK-based developer who created a demo that only featured both the Colonial Marine and Predator as playable characters but lacked the Alien, while its design document featured characters and locations that referenced Dark Horse Comics' Alien Versus Predator series, in addition to being one of his first projects when he started working for Atari Corporation in 1992 after leaving LucasArts. However, the project was put on hold and later cancelled as Atari Corp. focused its resources on the then-upcoming Jaguar but work on it was later restarted, as the company was ramping up production of then-upcoming titles for the Jaguar but it was originally intended to be a port of the Super Nintendo beat 'em up game Alien Vs. Predator, which was developed by the Japan-based developer Jorudan, but James felt it did not represent the franchise's universe and characters properly. He then submitted an updated design proposal of the project to both 20th Century Fox and Activision, which now labeled it as a first-person shooter with the ability of playing as either of the three characters and without elements from the comic book series. The decision of having three playable characters was an idea from Chris and Jason Kingsley, who both had the desire to play as either side. Atari also shared the original design documents from the cancelled Lynx game with Rebellion Developments, along with other concepts created by the former's internal team.

Alien vs Predator was initially developed entirely in-house by Rebellion in Oxford. Mike Beaton programmed the graphics engine, whilst the Kingsley brothers plus additional artists Stuart Wilson and Toby Harrison-Bamfield produced the artwork using the novel technique of photographing built models.  During this time, Rebellion's development team was expanded to assist with work on additional projects, including artist Justin Rae and programmer Rob Dibley working on Checkered Flag for the Jaguar, and programmer Jane "Andrew" Whittaker to assist with programming the gameplay engine for Alien vs Predator, which was jointly written by Beaton and Whittaker. Alien vs Predator was later scheduled for a Q2 1994 release, but the game's then-low budget caused multiple issues during development, leading it to be delayed for a holiday release on the same year for improvements. James Hampton acknowledged both Wolfenstein 3D and Doom as influences for the game, as he and Atari encouraged the development team to play games like them.

Alien vs Predator runs between 10-15 frames per second, with the in-game visuals being displayed at a 16-bit color format, while both cutscenes and static screens are rendered at the 24-bit color format. The system's Blitter and GPU processors are used to draw the textured surfaces on-screen and handle calculations respectively. The Alien's AI, dubbed "Alien Chess" by Andrew Whittaker, was created for the title and its function is to activate the enemies when the player approached them, among other features. The Colonial Marine is named after then-Atari employee Lance J. Lewis, who was one of the map designers, manual writers and lead tester for the title.

Art design 
During development, Alien vs Predator originally made use of hand-drawn graphics using the 256-color format but according to Jason and Chris Kingsley however, they were deemed not realistic enough for the intended atmosphere and instead it uses a combination of tile panels  for the texture-mapped graphics and model figures for sprites, an idea that came from both Stuart Wilson and Toby Harrison-Banfield. Both characters and tiles began with a series of production sketches drawn by the art team at Rebellion and by using the drawings as a starting basis, the team proceeded to create both models and tiles. Walls, ceilings and floors were constructed from scratch by using 5x5 inch tiles made up from various materials such as latex, wax and resin, while the details were then airbrushed and later photographed and digitized into the game by using a 35mm camera, with one particular tile created for the kitchen areas having drinking straws as pipes running across.

The same process was also applied to the character models, which used the same materials as the tiles but were created as a mix of both off-the-shelf kits from a local shop and custom-made models. Each of the animations seen in-game were then filmed using these models through the process of stop motion and digitization. Both the cover art for packaging and the title screen were rendered in LightWave 3D by freelance artist Andrew H. Denton. The Colonial Marine's HUD portrait is from Sean Patten, the producer of Iron Soldier, who was a fan of the franchise to the point of building replicas of the costumes seen in the movies and he was then digitized for the character's animations with the built costume. All of the graphics were compressed by using JagPEG, an Atari adaptation of the JPEG format, which compresses art assets into approximately an 8:1 ratio without loss of the pictures' quality. Both Atari and Rebellion were encouraged to watch the movies for reference, with one scene in Aliens being the template for the starting area.

Audio 
Many of the game's sound effects and voices samples were provided by Atari Corp.'s sound department, in addition to the films from both Alien and Predator series. The sound for when the Alien cocoons a Marine was done by Dan McNamee, one of the lead testers and level designers for the title, who took a bite out of an apple. The Marine voiceovers were done by James Grunke, one of the composers for the game and head of Atari's sound department. The computer voice heard in terminals found through the game was recorded by Sandra Miller, wife of Richard Miller, who was the former vice president of Atari Corp. and founder of VM Labs. The Alien screams were recorded from Richard Miller's then-newborn child.

Release 
Alien vs Predator was first showcased to the public at Atari's August 1993 press conference at Sunnyvale, California in a very early playable state and was also one of the first titles to be announced for the system, with magazines comparing it to Wolfenstein 3D in terms of its gameplay structure. In their October 1993 issue, GamePro magazine showcased screenshots from another very early build of the game, which featured different graphics compared to the final release, while in their next issue on the following month listed the game as a January 1994 title. The game made its first trade show appearance at the January WCES '94. The title had its last trade show appearance at Autumn ECTS '94.

Alien vs Predator was released on October 21, 1994. In France, the game was distributed by Accord. The title was also released in Japan on December 8 of the same year by Mumin Corporation, where it came with an exclusive Japanese manual and became the pack-in title for the system instead of Cybermorph. A CD-ROM conversion of the game for the Atari Jaguar CD was in the planning stages but it never moved forward beyond this phase. In addition, a virtual reality version of the title that supported the never-released Jaguar VR headset was also in development but it went unreleased.

Reception 

Alien vs Predator was one of Atari's most high-profile Jaguar games, and was eagerly awaited after several delays. Most reviews were favorable, with reviewers commenting on the atmospheric and frightening sounds and visuals, diversity of gameplay between the different characters and greater reliance on strategy over the standard first-person shooter formula. The title garnered multiple awards from both GameFan and VideoGames magazine, in addition of being referred by multiple publications as one of the best games for the Jaguar. It was also a commercial success and regarded as the Jaguar's killer app, selling between 52,223-85,000 copies and becoming one of the best-selling games for the system as of July 1995 though it is unknown how many were sold in total during its lifetime. In 2006, GameTrailers named the game one of the "Top Ten Scariest Games". They noted that while creepy on its own, the early hardware of the Atari Jaguar did not allow the player to notice an enemy sneaking up on them, and with little other noise to warn the player. 1UP.coms Jeremy Parish regarded it as an alternative to Gearbox Software's Aliens: Colonial Marines, though he remarked that the game has not aged well.

AllGames Colin Williamson praised the multiple campaigns, graphics, sound design and level design, stating that "All in all, Alien vs. Predator is one of the few must-buy titles for the Jaguar, and is certainly worth checking out if you're a fan of first-person shooters." Both Nicholas Gave and Alain Huyghues-Lacour of French magazine applauded its visual presentation, sound design, replay value and gameplay. Computer and Video Games Mark Patterson gave very high marks to the visuals, sound and gameplay. However, Rik Skews noted that the sound was the most disappointing aspect. Conversely, Edge gave the game 4 out of 10, negatively comparing it to Doom. Electronic Gaming Monthlys four reviewers commended the ability to play with three characters but criticized several design aspects, feeling it did not captured the same elements that made both Wolfenstein 3D and Doom popular. GamesMasters Marcus Hawkins commended the presentation and sound, as well as the replay value of each three campaigns. Next Generation stated that playing as the Marine felt movie-like but criticized the slow loading times and cumbersome controls.

Marco Schitz of German magazine Atari Inside regarded the Marine scenario to be the most varied and fun, stating that the game's overall atmosphere felt realistic and oppressive. Schitz claimed its addictive gameplay paralyzed work at Atari Insides editorial department for hours. Damien Lebigre and J.P. Rémy of French magazine CD Consoles criticized the creativity on display and sound design but praised its gameplay and graphics. Digital Press Edward Villapando noted that the title initially appeared to be long and difficulty as with other Atari Jaguar games but commended its sound design and replay value. The Electric Playgrounds Victor Lucas gave positive remarks to the claustrophobic atmosphere due to the lack of in-game music during gameplay and three campaigns, regarding it as one of the best Jaguar titles alongside Tempest 2000 and Doom. Electronic Games Steven L. Kent noted similarities with both Doom and Wolfenstein 3D due to its engine, criticizing the low-res sprites and controls but commended positively in regards to the realistic and fast depiction of Aliens, presentation and gameplay.

Game Players noted its lack of originality, regarding it as a Doom rip-off, but praise was given for being faithful to the AVP franchise and authentic depiction of each character. Games Worlds four reviewers gave the game a mixed outlook, giving positive remarks to the visuals while criticizing its slow pace. In contrast, Hobby Consolas Antonio Caravaca applauded its presentation, tense sound design, simplistic controls, replay value and sense of immersion with each playable character. Winnie Forster of German magazine MAN!AC, however, criticized both visual and sound aspects. Both Martin Weidner and Stephan Girlich of German publication Mega Fun commended its audiovisual presentation. Julien Van De Steene of French magazine Player One commented positively in regards to graphics, animations, sound design but felt mixed about the gameplay. Pavel Šinagl of Czech magazine Score criticized the title for its lack of originality and atmosphere but praised the visuals and audio. ST-Computer recommended players to play the game on a dark room and with headphones to enhance the atmosphere, stating that "For many fans of 3D action games, this game will become the purchase point of the Jaguar."

Brazilian magazine Super Game Power gave high remarks to aspects like graphics, audio, controls and fun factor. Bruno Sol of Spanish magazine Superjuegos praised the texture-mapped 3D visuals, audio design and the ability to play between three campaign, stating that "Alien vs Predator is the best business card the Atari Jaguar console could with for its official launch in Spain." Top Secrets Tyrus gave it a perfect score. Luis Sanz of Spanish publication Última Generación commended its ambiance due to the sound design and sense of panic when playing as the Marine, though he stated that the title does not take advantages of "possibilities taught by Doom". Ultimate Future Games gave the game a 79% score. Though Wolfgang Schaedle of German magazine Video Gamescriticized the music department, he nevertheless praised both graphics and sound effects. VideoGames Jim Loftus commented positively in regards to the realistic graphics, sound effects lifted from the movies and gameplay but criticized the complexity of each map. In 1995, Flux magazine ranked the game 60th on their "Top 100 Video Games."

Legacy 
A sequel, titled Alien vs Predator 2: Annihilation, was planned for the Jaguar CD after the first game was released. Atari Corporation opened discussions with Beyond Games about their interest in developing a sequel, however, the former dropped out of these negotiations shortly before they officially discontinued the Jaguar platform. An unfinished model of the Alien intended for the sequel is owned by Beyond Games' de facto successor - Smart Bomb Interactive, which later became WildWorks.

After its release, Rebellion Developments would go on to develop other games in the Alien vs. Predator franchise such as Aliens versus Predator for Microsoft Windows and Mac OS X in 1999, which used ideas that were provided to 20th Century Fox by Atari for the unreleased CD-ROM version of the Jaguar game. Years after its release, the game's source code would be released by Jaguar Sector II under a CD compilation for PC titled Jaguar Source Code Collection on August 24, 2008.

References

External links 
 
 Alien vs Predator at AtariAge
 Alien vs Predator at GameFAQs
 Alien vs Predator at MobyGames

1994 video games
Activision games
Alien vs. Predator (franchise) games
Atari games
Atari Jaguar games
Atari Jaguar-only games
Cancelled Atari Lynx games
Commercial video games with freely available source code
First-person shooters
1990s horror video games
Pack-in video games
Rebellion Developments games
Single-player video games
Video games developed in the United Kingdom
Video games with alternate endings
Video games with digitized sprites